The National Iraqi News Agency, or NINA, is the first independent news agency in Iraq after the Iraq War. It is primarily an Internet-based news outlet, although it plans to offer a WiFi platform in the near future. It has 15 editorial and executive staff at its head office in the Sadoun district of Baghdad and correspondents in all 18 Iraqi governorates.

See also
 Alive in Baghdad
 Federation of Arab News Agencies (FANA)

References

External links
 Official website

2005 establishments in Iraq
News agencies based in Iraq
Arab news agencies
Mass media in Baghdad